Jason Fischer (born March 3, 1985) is an American mixed martial artist who competes in the Lightweight division. A professional competitor since 2011, he has formerly fought in Bellator, Absolute Championship Berkut. 
and King of the Cage.

Background
Born in Redford, Michigan and raised in Livonia, Michigan, a suburb outside of Detroit, Fischer competed in wrestling at Livonia Stevenson High School. Fischer later continued his career at Central Michigan University.

Mixed martial arts career

Early career
Fischer started his professional career in 2011. Within his first year as a professional, he won three consecutive matches and in 2012 signed with Bellator.

Bellator
Fischer made his debut on April 6, 2012 at Bellator 64 against Taylor Solomon. He won via technical submission in the third round.

Fischer faced Kyle Prepolec on October 12, 2012 at Bellator 76. He defeated Prepolec via submission in the third round.

Fischer faced David Rickels on November 30, 2012 at Bellator 82. He was handed his first defeat via unanimous decision.

Fischer was expected to face Saad Awad on January 31, 2013 at Bellator 87. However, Awad had to replace Patricky Freire in the Season Eight Lightweight Tournament. Fischer instead faced Sevak Magakian, who has been defeated via submission in the first round.

Fischer was called to replace Alexander Sarnavskiy in the Season Eight Lightweight Tournament Semifinal due to a broken hand. He faced David Rickels again on February 28, 2013 at Bellator 91. Fischer was defeated once again via unanimous decision.

Fischer faced Tony Hervey on September 12, 2014 at Bellator 124. Fischer won via unanimous decision.

Coaching & Instructing
Fischer joined Dan Leith, who formed Commonwealth Jiu Jitsu in 2023, as the head black belt BJJ instructor in Livonia, Michigan.

Championships and accomplishments
Hard Knocks Fighting
HKF Lightweight Championship (One time; current)

Mixed martial arts record

|-
| Win
| align=center| 14-4
| Josh Wick
| Decision (unanimous)
| WXC 77: Warrior Wednesday 2
| 
| align=center| 3
| align=center| 5:00
| Southgate, Michigan, United States
|
|-
| Loss
| align=center| 13-4
| Daud Shaikheav
| Decision (majority)
| ACB 65: Leone vs. Ginazov
| 
| align=center| 3
| align=center| 5:00
| Rimini, Italy
|Return to Lightweight.
|-
| Win
| align=center| 9–3
| Adam Smith
| Decision (unanimous)
| WXC 68: Nemesis
| 
| align=center| 3
| align=center| 5:00
| Ypsilanti, Michigan, United States
|Catchweight (160 lbs) bout.
|-
| Win
| align=center| 9–3
| Dequan Townsend
| Decision (unanimous)
| WXC 66: Night of Champions 9
| 
| align=center| 3
| align=center| 5:00
| Southgate, Michigan, United States
|Welterweight debut; won WXC Welterweight Championship.
|-
| Win
| align=center| 9–3
| Rafael Alves
| TKO (injury)
| WXC 65: College Throwdown 2
| 
| align=center| 2
| align=center| 0:50
| Ypsilanti, Michigan, United States
|Won WXC Lightweight Championship.
|-
| Win
| align=center| 9–3
| Nick Compton
| Decision (unanimous)
| Fight Night At The Island
| 
| align=center| 3
| align=center| 5:00
| Welch, Minnesota, United States
| 
|-
| Win
| align=center| 9–3
| Jeremy Czarnecki
| Decision (unanimous)
| Duel Combat Sports 5
| 
| align=center| 3
| align=center| 5:00
| Detroit, Michigan, United States
| 
|-
| Win
| align=center| 8–3
| Ryan Dickson
| Decision (unanimous)
| Hard Knocks 42
| 
| align=center| 5
| align=center| 5:00
| Calgary, Alberta, Canada
| Won Hard Knocks Fighting Lightweight Championship
|-
| Win
| align=center| 7–3
| Tony Hervey
| Decision (unanimous)
| Bellator 124
| 
| align=center| 3
| align=center| 5:00
| Plymouth, Michigan, United States
| 
|-
| Loss
| align=center| 6–3
| Justin Wilcox
| Decision (unanimous)
| Bellator 114
| 
| align=center| 3
| align=center| 5:00
| West Valley City, Utah, United States
| 
|-
| Loss
| align=center| 6–2
| David Rickels
| Decision (unanimous)
| Bellator 91
| 
| align=center| 3
| align=center| 5:00
| Rio Rancho, New Mexico, United States
| Bellator Season Eight Lightweight Tournament Semifinal
|-
| Win
| align=center| 6–1
| Sevak Magakian
| Submission (rear-naked choke)
| Bellator 87
| 
| align=center| 1
| align=center| 3:37
| Mount Pleasant, Michigan, United States
| Bellator Season Eight Lightweight Tournament Alternate bout
|-
| Loss
| align=center| 5–1
| David Rickels
| Decision (unanimous)
| Bellator 82
| 
| align=center| 3
| align=center| 5:00
| Mount Pleasant, Michigan, United States
| 
|-
| Win
| align=center| 5–0
| Kyle Prepolec
| Submission (arm-triangle choke)
| Bellator 76
| 
| align=center| 3
| align=center| 3:19
| Windsor, Ontario, Canada
| 
|-
| Win
| align=center| 4–0
| Taylor Solomon
| Technical submission (rear-naked choke)
| Bellator 64
| 
| align=center| 3
| align=center| 4:59
| Windsor, Ontario, Canada
| 
|-
| Win
| align=center| 3–0
| Ivan Wolshlager
| TKO (retirement)
| IFL 39: Caged Apocalypse
| 
| align=center| 1
| align=center| 5:00
| Auburn Hills, Michigan, United States
| 
|-
| Win
| align=center| 2–0
| Roger Bontrager
| Submission (rear-naked choke)
| KOTC: Homecoming
| 
| align=center| 1
| align=center| 1:49
| Mount Pleasant, Michigan, United States
| 
|-
| Win
| align=center| 1–0
| Andrew Peterson
| KO (punch)
| IFL: The Saint Valentine's Day Massacre
| 
| align=center| 2
| align=center| 0:12
| Auburn Hills, Michigan, United States
|

References

Living people
Sportspeople from Detroit
American male mixed martial artists
Mixed martial artists from Michigan
Lightweight mixed martial artists
Mixed martial artists utilizing collegiate wrestling
Mixed martial artists utilizing Brazilian jiu-jitsu
1985 births
American male sport wrestlers
Amateur wrestlers
American practitioners of Brazilian jiu-jitsu
People awarded a black belt in Brazilian jiu-jitsu
Sportspeople from Wayne County, Michigan
People from Farmington, Michigan
People from Redford, Michigan